Stefan Galea (born 28 March 1996) is a Maltese singer. He is a two time finalist in the Malta Eurovision Song Contest in 2016 and 2023 respectively with his entries 'Light Up My Life' and ‘Heartbreaker’. He was also contestant on the first season of The X Factor Malta.

Career 

In 2009 Galea made it to the finals of the Malta Junior Eurovision Song Contest with his entry "Shake Up Wake Up" written by Stefan and produced by Philip Vella / Sean Vella. In January 2011 Galea's music was featured in Cannes, France at a music industry trade fair Midem alongside several local artists such as Lyndsay, Explicit, Chris Grech (26 Other Worlds), Galea's song which was produced by James Forrest was presented to various labels and industry movers.

During this time Galea collaborated with various artists including Malta Music Award Best Hip Hop/ RnB winner Dimal. He also was a support act for Ira Losco at her Music 4 Life concert in 2011, the UK's The Cheeky Girls, and also the Beatles tribute band.

Galea also took the stage to perform live with rock band Texanna at the Farsons Beer Festival accompanied by Rock Guitarist from 80's rock band FM "Andy Barnett", while also performing for the Italian Ambassador Mr. Andrea Trabalza. He also formed part of the HSBC Joseph Calleja Choir between 2010 – 2012.

Galea's debut single "Disco Lemonade" written and produced by Charlie Mason & Crush Boys, charted at 12 on the Maltese iTunes Charts. Having also been a student at Masquerade theatre and performing arts school for ten years, he took part in the MADC Christmas panto "RapunzelStiltskin" written by Steve Hili & directed by Steve Casaletto.

Galea has currently been working with Carlo Gerada and Matt "Muxu" Mercieca on his single "Escape" released in February 2015. The song also charted on the Malta Top 10 charts on 89.7 Bay and also on iTunes, and at present Galea has also been busy with numerous gigs with his guitarist Kurt Aquilina.

March 2015, Galea released his first music video for the song "Escape" directed and produced by Angie and Duane Laus from We Media. He also took part in the Malta Summer Hit Song Contest 2015, in which he placed second in the Maltese song category with "Xemx" (originally performed by The Tramps).

In 2016 Galea was also one of the 20 finalists for the Malta Eurovision Song Contest, with his song "Light Up My Life" which was written and composed by the Swedish sister duo Ylva & Linda Persson.

Discography

Singles 
"Disco Lemonade" (2013)
"Escape" (2015) Written & Produced by Carlo Gerada and Muxu
"Light Up My Life" (2016)
"Untrue" (2021)
”Heartbreaker” (2023)

Charted Singles

EPs 
My Evolution Vol 1
Disclosed Affairs

References 

21st-century Maltese male singers
21st-century Maltese singers
1996 births
Living people